The Draconinae are a subfamily of reptiles in the family Agamidae found in southern Asia and Oceania. Some taxonomists believe these genera belong to the subfamily Agaminae.

Genera
The subfamily includes the following genera:

 Acanthosaura – mountain horned dragons
 Agasthyagama – Indian kangaroo lizard
 Aphaniotis
 Bronchocela
 Calotes – garden lizards, bloodsuckers, and forest lizards
 Ceratophora
 Complicitus
 Cophotis
 Cristidorsa
 Dendragama
 Diploderma
 Draco – 'flying' lizards or gliding lizards
 Gonocephalus
 Harpesaurus
 Hypsicalotes
 Japalura
 Lophocalotes
 Lyriocephalus
 Lyriocephalus scutatus (Linnaeus, 1758) – hump-nosed lizard, lyreshead lizard
 Malayodracon
 Malayodracon robinsonii  
 Mantheyus
 Mantheyus phuwuanensis Manthey & Nabhitabhata, 1991 – Phuwua rock agama
 Microauris
Microauris aurantolabium (Pal et al., 2018) – small-eared dragon
 Monilesaurus
 Otocryptis
 Pelturagonia
 Phoxophrys
 Phoxophrys tuberculata Hubrecht, 1881 – Hubrecht's eyebrow lizard 
 Psammophilus
 Pseudocalotes
 Pseudocophotis
 Ptyctolaemus
 Salea
 Sarada – large fan-throated lizards
 Sitana – fan-throated lizards
 Tikiguania

Gallery

References

Agamidae
Reptile subfamilies
Taxa named by Leopold Fitzinger